Mason Township is one of fifteen townships in Effingham County, Illinois, USA.  As of the 2010 census, its population was 1,364 and it contained 598 housing units.

Geography

Cities, towns, villages
 Edgewood
 Mason

Extinct towns
 Bristol

Cemeteries
The township contains these thirteen cemeteries: Bailey, Brockett, Brown, Davidson, Edgewood, Leith, Mason, New Hope, Old Mason, Robinson, Saint Ann's Catholic, Wabash and Wright.

Major highways
  Interstate 57

Demographics

School districts
 Altamont Community Unit School District 10
 Effingham Community Unit School District 40

Political districts
 Illinois' 19th congressional district
 State House District 102
 State Senate District 51

References
 
 United States Census Bureau 2007 TIGER/Line Shapefiles
 United States National Atlas

External links
 City-Data.com
 Illinois State Archives

Townships in Effingham County, Illinois
1860 establishments in Illinois
Populated places established in 1860
Townships in Illinois